Mori (Móri in local dialect) is a comune (municipality) in Trentino in the northern Italian region Trentino-Alto Adige/Südtirol, located about  southwest of Trento.

Mori borders the following municipalities: Arco, Ronzo-Chienis, Isera, Rovereto, Nago-Torbole, Brentonico and Ala. Sights include the Sanctuary of Montalbano with the ruins of a castle, and the Ravezzone Bridge.

Sports
A.S.D. Mori Santo Stefano is the Italian football of the city and was founded in 1989 after the merger of Unione Sportiva Mori (founded in 1945) and Gruppo Sportivo Santo Stefano (founded in 1961). Currently it plays for the first time in Italy's Serie D after the promotion from Eccellenza Trentino-Alto Adige in the 2013–14 season.

The president is Luigi Bertolini and the manager is Davide Zoller.

Its home ground is Campo Sportivo Mori with 450 seats. The team's colors are yellow, green and black.

References

External links
Official website 

Cities and towns in Trentino-Alto Adige/Südtirol